Robert Cawthome was the co-founder of the Inter-Services Intelligence and founder of Pakistan Army Corps of Signals. He served as two star Major-General in the Pakistan army and set up the ISI to become its second Director General.

Career 
Robert Bill Cawthome was born in Australia and was a major general in the British Indian Army in the British India. After independence of Pakistan and India, he moved to Pakistan and joined the newly formed Pakistan army. He formed Pakistan Army Corps of Signals and served as the Deputy Chief of Staff in the army. Cawthome founded the Inter-Services Intelligence in 1948 along with Syed Shahid Hamid and some others after the Indo-Pakistani War of 1947–1948, which exposed weaknesses in intelligence gathering between the Pakistan Army, Air Force, Navy, Intelligence Bureau and Military Intelligence. The policies of the agency were his brain-child. He was promoted to two star Major-General in the army. In 1950 he became Director-General of Inter-Services Intelligence succeeding Syed Shahid Hamid. He was succeeded by	Riaz Hussain in 1959. After his retirement, Cawthome moved back to the United Kingdom and lived there till his death.

References 

British Indian Army officers
Pakistani generals
Pakistani spies
Directors General of Inter-Services Intelligence
Australian emigrants to Pakistan
Year of birth missing
Year of death missing